The Neftekamsk constituency (No. 6) is a Russian legislative constituency in the Bashkortostan Republic. The constituency was created in 2016 from parts of former Birsk (Neftekamsk and Agidel) and Tuymazy (Tuymazy and Oktyabrsky) constituencies.

Members elected

Election results

2016

|-
! colspan=2 style="background-color:#E9E9E9;text-align:left;vertical-align:top;" |Candidate
! style="background-color:#E9E9E9;text-align:left;vertical-align:top;" |Party
! style="background-color:#E9E9E9;text-align:right;" |Votes
! style="background-color:#E9E9E9;text-align:right;" |%
|-
|style="background-color: " |
|align=left|Rifat Shaykhutdinov
|align=left|Civic Platform
|146,324
|43.99%
|-
|style="background-color: " |
|align=left|Ilgam Galin
|align=left|Communist Party
|72,422
|21.77%
|-
|style="background-color: " |
|align=left|Sergey Anokhin
|align=left|A Just Russia
|31,040
|9.33%
|-
|style="background-color: " |
|align=left|Dmitry Ivanov
|align=left|Liberal Democratic Party
|23,830
|7.16%
|-
|style="background-color: " |
|align=left|Fairuza Latypova
|align=left|Patriots of Russia
|23,312
|7.01%
|-
|style="background:"| 
|align=left|Denis Musin
|align=left|Party of Growth
|18,011
|5.42%
|-
|style="background-color: " | 
|align=left|Ramil Mugalimov
|align=left|Rodina
|12,303
|3.70%
|-
| colspan="5" style="background-color:#E9E9E9;"|
|- style="font-weight:bold"
| colspan="3" style="text-align:left;" | Total
| 327,242
| 100%
|-
| colspan="5" style="background-color:#E9E9E9;"|
|- style="font-weight:bold"
| colspan="4" |Source:
|
|}

2021

|-
! colspan=2 style="background-color:#E9E9E9;text-align:left;vertical-align:top;" |Candidate
! style="background-color:#E9E9E9;text-align:left;vertical-align:top;" |Party
! style="background-color:#E9E9E9;text-align:right;" |Votes
! style="background-color:#E9E9E9;text-align:right;" |%
|-
|style="background-color: " |
|align=left|Rifat Shaykhutdinov (incumbent)
|align=left|Civic Platform
|166,107
|46.58%
|-
|style="background-color: " |
|align=left|Rail Adiyatullin
|align=left|United Russia
|66,535
|18.66%
|-
|style="background-color: " |
|align=left|Ilgam Galin
|align=left|Communist Party
|52,744
|14.79%
|-
|style="background-color: " |
|align=left|Linara Battalova
|align=left|Party of Pensioners
|13,784
|3.87%
|-
|style="background-color: " |
|align=left|Oleg Isayev
|align=left|New People
|10,996
|3.08%
|-
|style="background-color: " |
|align=left|Olga Shevnina
|align=left|A Just Russia — For Truth
|10,974
|3.08%
|-
|style="background-color: " |
|align=left|Yury Rudakov
|align=left|Liberal Democratic Party
|9,128
|2.56%
|-
|style="background-color: " |
|align=left|Rufina Shagapova
|align=left|The Greens
|6,291
|1.76%
|-
|style="background:"| 
|align=left|Vyacheslav Byzov
|align=left|Party of Growth
|5,634
|1.58%
|-
|style="background-color: " |
|align=left|Konstantin Zarubin
|align=left|Yabloko
|4,788
|1.34%
|-
|style="background-color: " | 
|align=left|Fyodor Vtoroy
|align=left|Rodina
|4,508
|1.26%
|-
| colspan="5" style="background-color:#E9E9E9;"|
|- style="font-weight:bold"
| colspan="3" style="text-align:left;" | Total
| 356,697
| 100%
|-
| colspan="5" style="background-color:#E9E9E9;"|
|- style="font-weight:bold"
| colspan="4" |Source:
|
|}

Sources
6. Нефтекамский одномандатный избирательный округ

References

Russian legislative constituencies
Politics of Bashkortostan